Captain John Alfred Moreton, Croix de Guerre (France), Legion d'Honneur (France), Order of Leopold (Belgium), China Medal (Boxer Rising with bar for Taku Forts) was an officer of the Royal Navy active in the First World War. For a short period of time in November, 1919 he was Military Governor of the Latvian city of Riga.

Naval career
Moreton joined the Royal Navy in 1891, and was promoted to lieutenant on 31 December 1898.

In early August 1902 he was appointed to the submarine depot ship , to take command of HM Submarine No.3.

He took a leading role in the British Campaign in the Baltic 1918-19 as part of the Allied intervention in the Russian Civil War. For a short period of time in November, 1919 he was Military Governor of the Latvian city of Riga.

References

Allied intervention in the Russian Civil War
Royal Navy officers of World War I
Companions of the Order of St Michael and St George
Companions of the Distinguished Service Order
Royal Navy personnel of the Russian Civil War
Royal Navy officers